Lujandeh (also Romanized as Lūjandeh) is a village in Ashrestaq Rural District, Yaneh Sar District, Behshahr County, Mazandaran Province, Iran. At the 2006 census, its population was 313, in 71 families.

References 

Populated places in Behshahr County